The 1953 All-Ireland Senior Football Championship was the 67th staging of Ireland's premier Gaelic football knock-out competition.

Kerry were the winners.

Results

Connacht Senior Football Championship

Leinster Senior Football Championship

Munster Senior Football Championship

Ulster Senior Football Championship

All-Ireland Senior Football Championship

Championship statistics

Miscellaneous

 O'Kennedy Park GAA Grounds replaces Barrett's Park, in New Ross in honor of Seán O'Kennedy.
 Casement Park, opens in Belfast named after a 1916 rising leader Roger Casement.
 Louth play Westmeath in the Leinster championship for the first time since 1938.
 The Leinster semi-final between Louth and Meath was a historic 9th year in a row of meeting in the Leinster championship a famous 13th meeting between them in 9 years. 
 The All Ireland semi-final between Roscommon and Armagh was the first championship meeting between them.
 Armagh play in their first All Ireland final but are beaten by Kerry.

References